Kolka Cool is a 2011 Latvian film directed by Juris Poskus, starring Iveta Pole, Artuss Kaimiņš, Andris Keišs, Aigars Apinis, Guna Zariņa, Māra Ķimele.

The film was awarded the Latvian National Film Prize Lielais Kristaps for the Best Actress (Iveta Pole), the Best Supporting Actor (Aigars Apinis) and the best Best Editing, as well as was nominated in seven more categories.

Plot 
The film depicts the mentality of the inhabitants of a small village on the Baltic coast. Three guys are trying to fulfill their lives by drinking beer, killing time and picking fights with neighboring villagers. The main character, Andzha, is trying to convince his girlfriend to marry him. The sudden arrival of his elder brother Guido starts a series of events where elevated self-esteem, pride and cravings for love that is stronger than death emerge as the dominant themes.

References

External links 
 
 Kolka Cool filmas.lv

Latvian drama films
2011 films
2011 drama films